Jane Hunter may refer to:

 Jane Hunter (scientist), Australian scientist
 Jane Edna Hunter (1881–1971), African-American social worker